Willanzheim is a market town in the district of Kitzingen in Bavaria in Germany.   Notable natives include Philipp Joseph Frick, b. April 14 1742, organist, composer, and performer on the glass armonica.

In 1853, a cache of 163 gold coins, mostly 14th century Florentine gold florins, was discovered in a dung-pit in a Willanzheim farm.   Some are now in the collection of the Staatliche Münzsammlung, München.

Notes

References

External links
 

Kitzingen (district)